Jean-Claude Dessein (1925-2011) was a French politician. He started his career as a mathematics teacher, then served as deputy mayor of Amiens. He served as a member of the National Assembly from 1981 to 1993, representing Somme.

References

1925 births
2011 deaths
People from Albert, Somme
Politicians from Hauts-de-France
Socialist Party (France) politicians
Deputies of the 7th National Assembly of the French Fifth Republic
Deputies of the 8th National Assembly of the French Fifth Republic
Deputies of the 9th National Assembly of the French Fifth Republic